The 1999 NatWest Trophy was the 19th NatWest Trophy.  It was an English limited overs county cricket tournament which was held between 4 May and 29 August 1999. The tournament was won by Gloucestershire who defeated Somerset by 50 runs in the final at Lord's.

Format
For the 1999 season, radical changes were made to the structure and format of the competition.  Each side's innings was reduced from 60 overs per side to 50, in order to bring the county one-day game in line with the format of One Day Internationals.  This in turn reduced the number of overs a bowler could bowl in an innings, down from 12 to 10.

The number of teams participating was also greatly expanded.  The 18 first-class counties were joined by all twenty Minor Counties, plus Huntingdonshire.  In a major change to previous tournaments, the cricket boards of Derbyshire, Durham, Essex, Gloucestershire, Hampshire, Kent, Lancashire, Leicestershire, Middlesex, Northamptonshire, Nottinghamshire, Somerset, Surrey, Sussex, Warwickshire, Worcestershire and Yorkshire were added to the competition.  The Ireland, Scotland and Netherlands teams also participated, as in previous years, while Denmark made its debut in the tournament.

The tournament retained its knockout format, but now with four rounds before the quarter-final and semi-final stages.  The winners of the semi-finals went on to the final at Lord's which was held on 29 August 1999.

First round

Second round

Third round

Fourth round

Quarter-finals

Semi-finals

Final

References

External links
CricketArchive tournament page

Friends Provident Trophy seasons
Natwest Trophy, 1999
NatWest Group